Emilio Cavenaghi, an Italian painter of landscapes and genre pieces, was born in Caravaggio in 1852. He studied under Giuseppe Bertini. La Stanza Poldi and The Music Amateur, are two of his best works. He also designed many woodcuts for book-illustrations. He painted the decorations and sipario (curtain) of Teatro Manzoni. He died at Milan in 1876.

He appears to be a sibling to Luigi Cavenaghi (Caravaggio, August 8, 1844 – Milano, December 7, 1918).

References

Attribution:
 

1852 births
1876 deaths
19th-century Italian painters
Italian male painters
Woodcut designers
Painters from Milan
19th-century Italian male artists